Namchi District  is a district of the Indian state of Sikkim. Its headquarters is at Namchi.

Geography 
South Sikkim lies at an altitude of 400 to 2000 metres and has a temperate climate for most of the year. Major urban centres include Namchi, Ravangla, Jorethang and Melli.

Assembly Constituencies
The district was previously divided into eight assembly constituencies.
Barfung (BL)
Poklok-Kamrang
Namchi-Singhithang
Melli
Namthang-Rateypani
Temi-Namphing 
Rangang-Yangang 
Tumen-Lingi (BL)

National protected area 
Maenam Wildlife Sanctuary

Economy 
South Sikkim is the most industrialised district in the state, owing to the availability of flat land. Since the geology is stable the roads are in good condition as compared to other parts of the state which suffer from landslides.  The district is also known for Sikkim tea, which is grown near Namchi.

Demographics 
According to the 2011 census, Namchi district has a population of 146,850, roughly equal to the nation of Saint Lucia. This gives it a ranking of 600th in India (out of a total of 640). Its population growth rate over the decade 2001–2011 was  11.57%. and has a sex ratio of 914 females for every 1000 males, and a literacy rate of 82.06%.

Namchi is one of the least populated regions of the state.  The people are mainly of Nepali descent. Other ethnic groups include the Lepcha and Bhutia communities. Nepali is the most widely spoken language in the district. The district was under the occupation of the Nepalese for 30 years in the eighteenth and nineteenth centuries.

Religion

Hinduism is followed by majority of the people in the South Sikkim district. Buddhism is followed by a considerable population.

Languages

At the time of the 2011 Census of India, 72.66% of the population in the district spoke Nepali, 3.88% Sikkimese, 3.61% Lepcha, 3.57% Limbu, 3.25% Hindi, 3.19% Sherpa, 2.46% Tamang, 1.65% Rai, 1.26% Bhojpuri, 0.88% Tibetan and 0.83% Bengali as their first language.

Flora and fauna 
The Maenam Wildlife Sanctuary was established in 1987.

Divisions

Administrative divisions 

South Sikkim is divided into two sub-divisions:

Villages 
 

Perbing

References

External links 

Official district government website

 
Districts of Sikkim